The Bjelke-Petersen Dam is a dam in Moffatdale near Cherbourg in the South Burnett Region, Queensland, Australia. The dam impounds Barker Creek and creates Lake Barambah. It is named after the Queensland Premier Joh Bjelke-Petersen. It is operated by Sunwater.

Geography 
The wall is an earth and rock fill structure with a central clay core, which can hold back  of water. The dam is generally shallow. Barker Creek provides the main inflow, while Four Mile Creek, Six Mile Creek, Frickey Creek and Cattle Creek also flow into the dam.

History 
Construction of the dam commenced in 1984 and finished in 1988. It created the lake that was named Lake Barambah after the original property in the region. The dam itself was named after the Queensland Premier Joh Bjelke-Petersen. The dam supplies water to the South Burnett region, mostly for irrigation purposes.

In the 1990s management of the camping and recreational facilities was handed to Murgon Shire Council, which became the South Burnett Regional Council following the local government amalgamations in 2008.

The dam first overflowed in February 1999, and reached its highest level of 195.01% (4.52m over the spillway) in January 2011.

In 2006, drought conditions had reduced dam levels to 5% of total capacity. With such low levels, visitors numbers had dropped significantly and local councils were concerned about maintaining drinking water for local towns.

SunWater, the managing organisation of the dam, is undertaking a dam spillway capacity upgrade program to ensure the highest level of safety for their dams is maintained. The spillway upgrade commenced in 2007.

Amenities 
Facilities for caravans, cabins, camping and day-trippers are extensive. Under normal conditions there are no boating restrictions, except near the dam wall.

There are two boat ramps into Lake Barambah known as:

 Bjelke-Petersen Dam (West)

 Bjelke-Petersen Dam (East)

Both are on Haager Drive and are managed by the South Burnett Regional Council.

Fishing
The dam is stocked with bass, golden perch, silver perch and southern saratoga. Additionally eel-tailed catfish, spangled perch and bony bream are present naturally. A Stocked Impoundment Permit is required to fish in the dam. The Bjelke-Petersen Dam Fishing Classic is held every October.

Illegally introduced sleepy cod and red-claw crayfish are maintaining breeding populations. In 2002, Tilapia were posing a threat to the dam, resulting in the need for pipeline screening to be implemented in an effort to stop eggs and larvae entering the dam.

See also

List of dams and reservoirs in Australia

References

Reservoirs in Queensland
Dams completed in 1988
Wide Bay–Burnett
Dams in Queensland
1988 establishments in Australia